Ted Pearson (born 1948 in Palo Alto, California) is an American poet. He is often associated with the Language poets.

Life and work
Pearson was born in 1948 in Palo Alto, California. He began studying liturgical music in 1960,  instrumental music in 1962 (with Harvey Samuels, Lee Konitz, and others), and began writing poetry in 1964 after Paul Desmond gave him a copy of Robert Creeley’s For Love. He subsequently attended VanderCook College of Music (Chicago), Foothill College (Los Altos Hills), and San Francisco State University (BA English, 1971).

In 1977, Pearson began his long association with the poets who were then actively involved in creating Language poetry, a new school of innovative writing that emerged in San Francisco, New York, and other places during this period. Among these poets were Rae Armantrout, Steve Benson, Alan Bernheimer, Carla Harryman, Lyn Hejinian, Tom Mandel, Bob Perelman, Kit Robinson, Ron Silliman, and Barrett Watten.

In 1988, Pearson left the Bay Area, and has since lived in Ithaca (1988–94), Buffalo (1994–97), Detroit (1997–2006), the Inland Empire (2006-2018), and Oakland (2018-2021). He now lives in Houston, Texas.

Selected publications
The Grit, 1976, Trike Books (San Francisco, CA)
The Blue Table, 1979, Trike Books (San Francisco, CA)
Soundings, 1980, Singing Horse Press (Blue Bell, PA)
Ellipsis, 1981, Trike Books (San Francisco, CA)
Refractions, 1982, Origin (Series 4) (Boston, MA)
Flukes, 1982, Privately Printed (San Francisco, CA)
Coulomb's Law, 1984, Square Zero Editions (San Francisco, CA)
Mnemonics, 1985, Gaz (San Francisco, CA)
Catenary Odes, 1987, O Books (Oakland, CA)
Evidence: 1975-1989, Gaz 1989, (San Francisco, CA)
Planetary Gear, 1991, Roof Books (New York, NY)
Mnèmoniques, 1992, Trans. Françoise de Laroque, Un bureau sur l'Atlantique (Royaumont, France)
Acoustic Masks, 1994, Zasterle Press (Tenerife, Spain)
The Devil's Aria, 1999, Meow Press (Buffalo, NY)
Songs Aside: 1992-2002, 2003, Past Tents Press (Detroit, MI)
Encryptions, 2007, Singing Horse Press (San Diego, CA)
Extant Glyphs: 1964-1980, 2014, Singing Horse Press (San Diego, CA)
An Intermittent Music: 1975-2010, 2016, Chax Press (Victoria, TX)
The Coffin Nail Blues, 2016, Atelos (Berkeley, CA)
After Hours, 2016, Singing Horse Press (San Diego, CA)
The Markov Chain, 2017, Shearsman Press (Bristol, UK)
Trace Elements, 2019, Tuumba Press (Berkeley, CA)
Personal Effects, 2019, BlazeVox Books (Kenmore, NY)
Exit Music, 2019, Singing Horse Press (San Diego, CA)
Last Date, 2020, Singing Horse Press (San Diego, CA)
Set Pieces, 2021, Spuyten Duyvil (New York, NY)
Durations, 2022, Selva Oscura Press (Chicago, IL)

External links
 Performance by the author at SUNY Buffalo
 The author reading at the Kelly Writers House of the University of Pennsylvania.
 The author  in 2007 at the University of California Berkeley.

1948 births
American male poets
Language poets
Living people
Poets from California